Ramisetti Murali (born 30 July 1963) is an Indian Social Worker and Activist involved in environmental and civil society initiatives comprising water, farming, eradication of child labour, health and nutrition and waste management. Murali presently heads the Freshwater Action Network in South Asia (FANSA), a regional water body of South Asian countries. and is also the founder-Director of Modern Architects for Rural India (MARI) based in Secunderabad.

The reformatory initiatives of Murali enthused many.  Patrick Donahue of BRINQ wrote that Murali is among those who can paint his visions of a better world into reality.  In 2011, Murali spoke at an All-party parliamentary group chaired by Baroness Kinnock in England on the threats to water resources.  Rural development is one of the key focus of Murali's interests and has been proactively participating in community programmes since the past few decades.  While Naxalism sought to alleviate peoples suffering through use of force against the State, Murali's approach through Participatory management helped set up schools in rural Warangal much to the chagrin of the State Education officials.

Career
After completing social work studies at Waltair and Nagpur, Murali began to work for the social causes in the 1980s at the Hyderabad-based Centre for Environmental Concerns and followed his call and started Modern Architects for Rural India (MARI) focusing on Warangal region in Telangana.

Writings

References

1963 births
Living people
Social workers from Andhra Pradesh
People from Guntur district
Telugu people
Indian environmentalists
Indian civil rights activists
Social workers
Indian social reformers
Rashtrasant Tukadoji Maharaj Nagpur University alumni
Andhra University alumni